Ostrov Sokrovishch or Ostrov Sokrovišč (the Romanization of the word ) may refer to:

 Treasure Island (1988 film), a Soviet animated musical film released by Kievnauchfilm
 Treasure Island (1982 film), a Soviet film
 Treasure Island (1971 film), a Soviet adventure film
 Treasure Island (1938 film), a Soviet film by Vladimir Vaynshtok

See also
 Treasure Island (disambiguation)

Disambiguation pages